Zoe is an unincorporated community in eastern Le Flore County, Oklahoma, United States.

The community is on a county road just east of combined US routes 59-270. Heavener is approximately eight miles to the north. The Black Fork of the Poteau River flows past the north side of the community.

References

Unincorporated communities in Oklahoma
LeFlore County, Oklahoma